Over the Rainbow is the sixth novel by British writer Paul Pickering. It is an often darkly comic love story set against the background of the war and aid work in Afghanistan.

Notes

External links
Debrett's People of Today 21 August 2005
Collected reviews
Paul Pickering at Simon & Schuster USA.
Paul Pickering at Simon & Schuster UK.
Paul Pickering's website

2012 British novels
Novels by Paul Pickering
Novels set during the War in Afghanistan (2001–2021)
Simon & Schuster books